The 1925 Washington and Lee Generals football team was an American football team that represented Washington and Lee University as a member of the Southern Conference during the 1925 football season. In its fourth and final season under head coach Jimmy DeHart, Washington and Lee compiled a 5–5 record (5–1 against conference opponents), finished in fourth place in the conference, and outscored opponents by a total of 111 to 104.

Washington and Lee's team captain James Kay Thomas was selected as a first-team end on the All-Southern team compiled by the Associated Press.

Schedule

References

Washington and Lee
Washington and Lee Generals football seasons
Washington and Lee Generals football